Rodents of unusual size may refer to:
 mythical creatures that live in the Fire Swamp, found in the novel The Princess Bride.
 Rodents of Unusual Size, a 2017 documentary film directed by Quinn Costello, Chris Metzler, and Jeff Springer.